The 1973 European Figure Skating Championships was a senior-level international competition held in Cologne, West Germany from February 6 to 11, 1973. Elite senior-level figure skaters from European ISU member nations competed for the title of European Champion in the disciplines of men's singles, ladies' singles, pair skating, and ice dancing.

Results

Men

Ladies

Pairs

Ice dancing

References

External links
 results

European Figure Skating Championships, 1973
European Figure Skating Championships, 1973
European Figure Skating Championships
Figure skating in West Germany
Sports competitions in Cologne
February 1973 sports events in Europe
1970s in Cologne